Myrcia paganii is a species of plant in the family Myrtaceae. It is endemic to Puerto Rico.

Myrcia paganii is listed as endangered by the United States and Puerto Rico.  It is classified as a perennial tree or shrub. There is a US Fish and Wildlife recovery plan in process.

References

paganii
Endemic flora of Puerto Rico
Critically endangered plants
Taxonomy articles created by Polbot
Taxobox binomials not recognized by IUCN